Bambino Mio is a brand of reusable nappies, manufactured and sold by a company of the same name based in Brixworth, Northamptonshire, UK. Bambino Mio nappies are widely used in the UK, and are sold in more than 70 countries.

As well as nappies, the company sells related products such as nappy liners, reusable swim nappies, potty training pants, reusable baby wipes, and laundry detergent.

History
Bambino Mio was founded in 1997 by husband and wife Guy and Jo Schanschieff, after noting similar businesses in New York and Australia. The couple set up a reusable nappy laundry service from their home in Northampton, UK, and started to sell reusable nappies (Cloth diapers) and associated products directly to parents through mail order under the name Bambino Mio.

In 2003, the company enrolled in the UK Passport to Export scheme, and by 2006 it had recruited several multilingual employees and set up a web site to manage international sales in 24 languages. In 2007, Bambino Mio were presented with two Northamptonshire Business Excellence awards.

Founders
Guy Schanschieff was awarded an MBE in the 2011 New Year Honours List for his services to business. In 2003 he founded the North Somerset Nappy Alliance, now called The Nappy Alliance, an association which represents manufacturers and distributors of reusable nappies when dealing with political affairs and local government.  In 2014 Schanschieff was promoted to Chairman of The Nappy Alliance.

References 

Pollock, Claire & Silvester, Liz, Kids Superbrands (2006)

External links 

Companies established in 1997
Clothing companies of the United Kingdom